The Asia/Oceania Zone is one of the three zones of the regional Davis Cup competition in 1993.

In the Asia/Oceania Zone there are three different tiers, called groups, in which teams compete against each other to advance to the upper tier. Winners in Group II advanced to the Asia/Oceania Zone Group I. Teams who lost their respective ties competed in the relegation play-offs, with winning teams remaining in Group II, whereas teams who lost their play-offs were relegated to the Asia/Oceania Zone Group III in 1994.

Participating nations

Draw

 and  relegated to Group III in 1994.
 promoted to Group I in 1994.

First round

Malaysia vs. China

Jordan vs. Iran

Pakistan vs. Sri Lanka

Thailand vs. Kuwait

Second round

Iran vs. China

Thailand vs. Pakistan

Relegation play-offs

Jordan vs. Malaysia

Kuwait vs. Sri Lanka

Third round

China vs. Thailand

References

External links
Davis Cup official website

Davis Cup Asia/Oceania Zone
Asia Oceania Zone Group II